Miss World Kenya is a national pageant in Kenya to represent Kenya at Miss World.

History
In 2005 Miss World Kenya took on a positive turn under the management of Ashleys Kenya Limited starting a journey of status restoration and reinvigoration.

Titleholders
 
Miss World Kenya has started to send a Winner to Miss World since 2005. Before 2005 the Miss Kenya organization sent its delegate to Miss World. On occasion, when the winner does not qualify (due to age) for either contest, a runner-up is sent.

External links
Official Website

References

Beauty pageants in Kenya
Kenya
Recurring events established in 2005
Kenyan awards